My Name Is Rocco Papaleo is a 1971 Italian comedy film directed by Ettore Scola.

Cast
 Marcello Mastroianni as Rocco
 Lauren Hutton as Jenny
 Brizio Montinaro
 Paola Natale
 Margot Novak
 Tom Reed
 Umberto Travaglini

References

External links

1971 films
1970s sports comedy films
Italian boxing films
Italian sports comedy films
1970s Italian-language films
Films directed by Ettore Scola
Films set in Chicago
Films shot in Chicago
Films about immigration to the United States
Films with screenplays by Ruggero Maccari
1971 comedy films
Films with screenplays by Ettore Scola
1970s Italian films